José Manuel Murillo Morán (born 24 February 1995) is a Panamanian football player who plays as midfielder for Comunicaciones in Guatemala.

Playing career
Murillo spent most of his early career with Plaza Amador, before a stint with Deportivo Municipal in 2019. Murillo made his professional debut with Deportivo Municipal in a 3-0 Peruvian Primera División win over Melgar on 17 February 2019. He signed with Comunicaciones on 12 August 2020.

International career
Murillo made his debut for the Panama national team in a 0-0 friendly tie with Nicaragua on 26 February 2020.

International goals
Scores and results list Panama's goal tally first.

References

External links
 
 NFT Profile

1995 births
Living people
Footballers from Bogotá
Panamanian footballers
Panama international footballers
Colombian footballers
Colombian people of Panamanian descent
People with acquired Panamanian citizenship
Association football midfielders
Comunicaciones F.C. players
Deportivo Municipal footballers
Liga Nacional de Fútbol de Guatemala players
Peruvian Primera División players
Liga Panameña de Fútbol players
Panamanian expatriate footballers
Colombian expatriate footballers
Panamanian expatriates in Chile
Colombian expatriates in Chile
Expatriate footballers in Chile
Panamanian expatriates in Guatemala
Colombian expatriates in Guatemala
Expatriate footballers in Guatemala